The Rolex Oyster Perpetual Date GMT Master is part of the Rolex Professional Watch Collection. Designed in collaboration with the now defunct Pan American Airways of the United States for use by their pilots and navigators, it was launched in 1954.

History
The Rolex GMT-Master wristwatch was originally designed in collaboration with the Pan American Airways and issued by the airline to their crews on long-haul flights. ("GMT" in the name  stands for Greenwich Mean Time, which was later replaced by Coordinated Universal Time (UTC), though the watch kept its name). The original GMT Master watch has a 24-hour display fourth hand complication directly linked to and displaying the same time zone as the standard 12-hour hand. This GMT hand enabled the crews to set the watch to GMT or another time zone, and, using the rotatable 24-hour scale bezel, set to the correct offset, a second time zone could be read. GMT or UTC is the time zone that is required for all aviation planning, weather forecasts, schedules and other paperwork.

In the early 1980s the Rolex GMT-Master II was released (although production of the original version continued alongside it until 1999).  Although the watch looks almost identical it uses a movement that has the additional capability of an independently adjustable quickset hour hand that can be adjusted to local time without stopping the seconds or disturbing the minutes and 24 hour GMT hand.  As the watch continues to feature the rotatable bezel it is able to quickly compute any third time zone reference.

Although the original Rolex GMT Master was available only in stainless steel, as it was conceived as a functional work watch, Rolex has been making luxury versions in both mixed steel and gold, and all-gold since the 1950s, and there are even exotic variations that incorporate elaborate designs that include precious stones.

50th anniversary edition
An updated Rolex GMT Master II was released in 2005. This new model features a number of technical changes, such as Rolex's patented Parachrom hairspring as well as a larger Triplock crown (from the diver's watches). The new model also has several cosmetic changes, such as larger case, hands and hour markers and also a new bezel made using an extremely hard ceramic material that is designed to be more scratch and fade resistant. Also included in the update is a new and more luxurious style of bracelet that has heavier solid links and a machined clasp. The stainless steel version now joins the precious metal versions by having highly polished centre links on its bracelet.

Ceramic bezel models

In 2007, Rolex introduced the ceramic bezel insert to the GMT-Master II range, replacing the aluminum insert (colors created using an anodizing process) that had been used since 1959. While ceramic is much more scratch resistant than aluminum, Rolex initially could not continue to produce the two-color bezel used to distinguish between the day and night times of the second time zone, particularly the color red which could not be created satisfactorily in ceramic.

In 2013, Rolex created the first two-tone ceramic bezel, in blue and black, for the steel GMT-Master II nicknamed “Batman”. The blue and black bezel is made of Cerachrom, Rolex's patented version of ceramic; it is produced through a patented process of creating two colors out of a mono-block Cerachrom bezel.

In 2014, Rolex was able to create the red color on the ceramic bezel for the new incarnation of the red-and-blue "Pepsi", although in order to recoup the higher cost of this bezel it was only initially available on the white gold GMT-Master II. All of these GMT-Master II watches use the Caliber 3186 movement.

In 2018, Rolex would issue the red-and-blue "Pepsi" on a new steel GMT-Master II, which also has a Jubilee bracelet in lieu of the Oyster bracelet, and it will continue to be sold alongside the older white gold "Pepsi" watch.  Two more GMT-Master II models were also introduced, one in red Everose gold and in steel, and another in Everose gold, both with a two-tone brown and black bezel giving them the nickname "Root Beer". These new GMT-Master IIs released in 2018 all use the new Caliber 3285 movement which adds Paraflex shock absorber and a 70-hour power reserve (instead of 48 hours) over the Caliber 3186.

In 2019, Rolex issued a new version of the Batman, and discontinued the older version. The caliber was upgraded to the Caliber 3285 movement. The bracelet was changed to a Jubilee, which has five-piece links and an Oysterclasp lock.

In 2021, Rolex re-issued the Oyster bracelet as an option for both the red-and-blue "Pepsi" and the blue-and-black "Batman" in addition to the existing Jubilee that was released in 2018 and 2019, respectively. This came as quite a surprise for fans, as the original ceramic "Pepsi" came on the Oyster with a black dial, making it an exclusive choice. The only distinguishing feature for the newer white gold model is the blue or meteorite dial, however the differences in appearance for the 2014 white gold and the 2021 steel is the movement.

Related pages 

 Rolex Daytona
 Rolex Day-Date
 Rolex Datejust
 Rolex Milgauss
 Rolex Sea Dweller
 Rolex Submariner
 Rolex Yacht-Master

References

External links
Rolex.com - Official Rolex Website
GMT Master History - good overview over the evolution of the Rolex GMT Master
Rolex GMT Master 16710 review by John B. Holbrook II
Rolex GMT Master 16710 review by JPE
Rolex GMT Master Kleinanzeigen

Rolex watches
Products introduced in 1954